In the 2006–07 season, Celta Vigo participated in La Liga, the Copa del Rey and the UEFA Cup.

Squad stats 
Last updated on 15 February 2021.

|-
|colspan="14"|Players who have left the club after the start of the season:

|}
1. On loan from Porto
2. On loan from Real Madrid
3. On loan from Spartak Moscow
4. On loan from Olympique de Marseille

Results

La Liga

League table

Matches

Copa del Rey

Round of 32 

Deportivo Alavés won 1–0 on aggregate

UEFA Cup

First round 

Celta Vigo won 4–0 on aggregate

Group H

Round of 32 

Celta Vigo won 3–2 on aggregate

Round of 16 

Werder Bremen won 3–0 on aggregate

References 

RC Celta de Vigo seasons
Celta Vigo